Edda Manga (born 1969) is a Swedish historian of ideas, speaker and debator. Manga won the Clioprize in 2004 for her doctorate thesis Gudomliga uppenbarelser och demoniska samlag ("Divine revelations and demonic intercourses"). She was a summer host on Sveriges Radio P1 during Sommar i P1 on 14 June 2004. In 2011 she together with her husband was a speaker at the summer camp of the Communist Party in Sweden, though she is not a member. Since January 2016 she works as a researcher at Mångkulturellt centrum (tr: Multicultural center). Edda Manga is active in public debates and is a defender of Muslim women in Sweden to wear the hijab. She has in turn been criticised for trivialising the issue of women as victims of violent honor cultures in Sweden.

Gaza flotilla
Manga is married to historian Mattias Gardell. They were aboard MV Mavi Marmara as part of the flotilla which tried to break the Israeli embargo of the Gaza strip, before Israeli armed forces attacked the flotilla on the morning of 31 May 2010. Manga was deported from Israel and landed in Sweden on 3 June along with her husband and other Swedish left-wing activists.  She denied allegations of IHH being a militant Islamist organisation, saying "They are not turkish islamists. They are a muslim organisation working with humanitarian aid in 143 countries." She further called the Israeli action irrational.

Works
Slöjor, Authors Elin Berge, Edda Manga, Atlas, 2006, 
Gudomliga uppenbarelser och demoniska samlag Glänta produktion, 2003, 
Santas visiones y pecados extraordinarios Cecilia Rodríguez, Editor Edda Manga, Göteborgs universitet, 2002,

References

External links 
eddamanga - Personal weblog

1969 births
Living people
21st-century Swedish historians
Swedish women historians